James R. Packard (September 23, 1931 - October 1, 1960) was a racing driver from Hendersonville, North Carolina who competed in the USAC Championship Car series.  He made 22 starts and registered a single win in August 1960 at the Illinois State Fairgrounds Racetrack, however he was killed in an accident during a midget race in Fairfield, Illinois on October 1 of that year.  He attempted to qualify for the Indianapolis 500 in 1959 and 1960 but wrecked his car in practice in 1959 and failed to make the field the following year.

Complete USAC Championship Car results

References

External links 
 

1931 births
1960 deaths
Burials in Indiana
People from Hendersonville, North Carolina
Racing drivers from North Carolina
Racing drivers who died while racing
Sports deaths in Illinois